Bandung is the capital city of the Indonesian province of West Java. It has a population of 2,452,943 within its city limits according to the official estimates as at mid 2021, making it the fourth most populous city in Indonesia. Greater Bandung (Bandung Basin Metropolitan Area/BBMA) is the country's second-largest metropolitan area, with over 11 million inhabitants. The city lies on a river basin surrounded by volcanic mountains that provides a natural defence system, which was the primary reason for the Dutch East Indies government's plan to move the capital from Batavia (modern-day Jakarta) to Bandung.

The Dutch first established tea plantations around the mountains in the 18th century, and a road was constructed to connect the plantation area to the colonial capital Batavia ( to the northwest). In the early 20th century, the Dutch inhabitants of Bandung demanded the establishment of a municipality (gemeente), which was granted in 1906, and Bandung gradually developed into a resort city for plantation owners. Luxurious hotels, restaurants, cafés, and European boutiques were opened, leading the city to be nicknamed Parijs van Java.

After Indonesia declared independence in 1945, the city experienced ongoing development and urbanization, transforming from an idyllic town into a dense 16,500 people/km2 (per square kilometre) metropolitan area with living space for over 8 million people. New skyscrapers, high-rise buildings, bridges, and gardens have been constructed. Natural resources have been heavily exploited, particularly by conversion of the protected upland area into highland villas and real estate. Although the city has encountered many problems (ranging from waste disposal and floods to a complicated traffic system resulting from a lack of road infrastructure), it still attracts large numbers of tourists, weekend sightseers, and migrants from other parts of Indonesia. In 2017 the city won a regional environmental sustainability award for having the cleanest air among major cities in ASEAN. The city is also known as a Smart City, leveraging technology to improve government services and social media that alert residents to issues such as floods or traffic jams. Bandung is Indonesia's major technology centre. The city is part of the UNESCO Creative Cities Network, which it joined in 2015.

The first Asian-African Conference, the Bandung Conference, was hosted in Bandung by President Sukarno in 1955. Redevelopment of the existing Husein Sastranegara International Airport (BDO) was completed in 2016. To improve infrastructure, the construction of the Jakarta-Bandung high-speed rail was started in 2016 and was projected to be completed in 2021. This was to be complemented by an indigenous type of Automated People Mover (APM) and Light Rail Transit (LRT). The new larger second airport, Bandung Kertajati International Airport (KJT), opened in June 2018, just in time for the 2018 Asian Games.

History

The official name of the city during the colonial Dutch East Indies period was Bandoeng. The earliest reference to the area dates back to 1488, although archaeological findings suggest a type of Homo erectus species had long previously lived on the banks of the Cikapundung River and around the old lake of Bandung. During the 17th and 18th centuries, the Dutch East Indies Company (VOC) established plantations in the Bandung area. In 1786, a supply road connecting Batavia (now Jakarta), Bogor, Cianjur, Bandung, Sumedang and Cirebon was constructed. In 1809, Napoleon Bonaparte, French Emperor and conqueror of much of Europe, including the Netherlands and its colonies, ordered the Dutch Indies Governor H.W. Daendels to improve the defensive systems of Java to protect against the British in India. In 1810, the road was laid down in Bandung and was named De Groote Postweg (or the 'Great Post Road'), the present-day location of Jalan Asia-Afrika. Under Daendels' orders, R. A. Wiranatakusumah II, the Chief Administrator of the Bandung regency at that time, moved the office from Krapyak, in the south, to a place near a pair of holy city wells (sumur Bandung), the present-day site of the city square (alun-alun). He built his dalem (palace), masjid agung (the grand mosque) and pendopo (public-official meeting place) in the classical Sundanese orientation, with the pendopo facing Tangkuban Perahu mountain, which was believed to have a mystical ambience. In 1856, Bandung also became the capital of the  Preanger Regencies Residency, which it would remain until 1925.

In 1880, the first major railroad between Batavia and Bandung was completed, boosting the light industry in Bandung. Chinese flocked into the city to help run facilities, services and vendors. The area adjacent to the train station is still recognisable as the old Chinatown district. In 1906, Bandung was given the status of gemeente (municipality), and then twenty years later, stadsgemeente (city municipality).

Beginning of time the early 1920s, the Dutch East Indies government made plans to move their capital from Batavia to Bandung. Accordingly, during this decade, the Dutch colonial government commenced construction of military barracks, the building housing the colonial Department of State-Owned Enterprises (Department van Gouvernmentsbedrijven, the present-day Gedung Sate) and other government buildings. However, this plan was cut short by World War II, after which the Dutch were not able to re-establish their colony due to the Indonesian Declaration of Independence.

The fertile area of the Parahyangan Mountains surrounding Bandung supports productive tea plantations. In the nineteenth century, Franz Junghuhn introduced the cinchona (kina) plant. With its cooler elevated landscape, surrounded by major plantations, Bandung became an exclusive European resort area. Wealthy plantation owners visited the city on weekends, attracting ladies and business people from the capital, Batavia. Jalan Braga grew into a promenade street with cafés, restaurants and boutique shops. Two art-deco style hotels, Savoy Homann and Preanger, were built in the vicinity of the Concordia Society, a clubhouse for the wealthy with a large ballroom and a theatre.

After Indonesian independence in 1945, Bandung was designated as the capital of West Java province. During the Indonesian National Revolution, some of the most massive battles occurred in and around Bandung. Dutch troops were virtually absent in Java at the end of World War II. To assist the restoration of Dutch sovereignty, the British took a military hold on Java's major cities, and the British military commander set an ultimatum for the Indonesian combatants in Bandung to leave the city. In response, on 24 March 1946, much of the southern part of Bandung was deliberately set alight as the combatants left; an event known as Bandung Lautan Api or the 'Bandung Sea of Fire'.

In 1955, the first Asian-African Conference, also known as the Bandung Conference, was hosted in Bandung by President Sukarno and attended by the heads of states representing twenty-nine independent countries from Asia and Africa. The conference venue was at the Gedung Merdeka, the former Concordia Society building. The conference announced ten points of declaration for the promotion of world peace and opposition against colonialism and is known as the Declaration of Bandung. This was followed by a wave of nationalism and decolonisation movements around the globe which remapped world politics. The conference was also the first international conference of people of colour in history. In his book The Color Curtain, Richard Wright claims that there was an epic meaning to the conference for people of colour around the world.

In 1987, the city boundary was expanded by the 'Greater Bandung' (Bandung Raya) plan, with the relocation of higher concentration development zones outside the city in an attempt to dilute population density in the old city. During this development, the city core was often uprooted, with old buildings torn down, lot sizes regrouped and rezoned, changing idyllic residential areas to commercial zones with bustling chain supermarkets, malls, banks and upscale developments.

In 2005, an Asian-African Conference was partly held in Bandung, attended by world leaders including Indonesian President Susilo B. Yudhoyono, President of China Hu Jintao, Prime Minister of India Manmohan Singh, President of South Africa Thabo Mbeki and President of Nigeria Obasanjo.

Geography

The basin's main river is the Citarum; one of its branches, the Cikapundung, divides Bandung from north to south before it merges with Citarum again in Dayeuhkolot. The Bandung Basin is an essential source of water for potable water, irrigation, and fisheries, with its  of groundwater being a significant reservoir for the city.
The northern section of Bandung is hillier than other parts of the city, and the unique truncated flat-peak shape of the Tangkuban Perahu volcano (Tangkuban Perahu literally means 'upside-down boat') can be seen from the city to the north. Long-term volcanic activity has created fertile andisol soil in the north, suitable for intensive rice, fruit, tea, tobacco, and coffee plantations. In the south and east, alluvial soils deposited by the Cikapundung river predominate.

Geological data shows that the Bandung Basin is located on an ancient volcano, known as Mount Sunda, erected up to  during the Pleistocene age. Two large-scale eruptions took place; the first formed the basin, and the second (est. 55,000 BCE) blocked the Citarum river, turning the basin into a lake known as "the Great Prehistoric Lake of Bandung". The lake drained away; for reasons which are the subject of ongoing debate among geologists.

Climate
Bandung experiences tropical monsoon climate (Am) according to Köppen climate classification as the driest month precipitation total is below , bordering with subtropical highland climate (Cfb). The average temperature throughout the year tends to be cooler than most cities in Indonesia due to the altitude influence. The average temperature throughout the year only has little variation due to its location near the equator.

Bandung is also well known for its tornado hotspot. The first deadly tornado in the area occurred in Rancaekek (during the Dutch Occupation on 1933 where a tornado struck the town, killing 1 and injuring none, the funnel destroyed 17 homes and left 30 homes badly damaged, many trees were either snapped or downed. Another deadly tornado to occur on Bandung was on December 18, 2014 in Gedebage, the tornado struck the area in the afternoon. It left 85 houses either unroofed or destroyed, a large factory building suffered significant damage, a warehouse levelled and a library suffered roof loss, one person died due to crushed by a collapsed wall.

Environmental issues
The north of the city serves as a water reservoir for Bandung. However, the area has seen substantial residential development. Several attempts to protect this area have been made, including creating reserves such as the Juanda National Park and Puncrut, but development continues. Regular flooding in Bandung's south also presents a real and dangerous ongoing problem.

From mid-2005, Bandung faced another environmental disaster when the city's landfill site was reevaluated after a garbage slide 2005 which buried a village, Kampung Gajah, beneath it, killing over a hundred people. The provincial government has failed in its attempts to solve the garbage issue. Nevertheless, it was awarded in 1997 and 2015 as the least polluted city in the country. Further, a regional award in 2017 was also given from ASEAN for the cleanest air among other major cities in ASEAN countries.

Administrative divisions

The city administration is divided into 30 districts (kecamatan) and 153 villages (kelurahan). For development purposes, the 30 districts are grouped into eight sub-city regions. The sub-city regions of Bandung are Arcamanik, Cibeunying, Kerees, Kordon, Gedebage, Ujungberung, Bojonagara and Tegalega. The mayor (walikota) - Oded Muhammad Danial 2018 - leads the city administration. Since 2008, city residents have directly voted for a mayor; previously, mayors were nominated and selected by the city council - the Regional People's Representative Council (DPRD), which has 50 members. As of 2003, the total number of city administration personnel was 20,163.

Bandung City is divided into 30 districts (kecamatan), listed below with their populations at the 2010 Census:

Economy

The city's economy is mainly built upon tourism, business, creative industry, high-tech and manufacturing industries, educational institutions, technology, retail services, financial services, pharmaceutical companies, and food production. The once quiet residential district of Dago has become an important business and entertainment centre with chic cafés and restaurants spread out along Jalan Dago. In the early 1990s, Jalan Cihampelas became a popular clothing store location and remains so today.

Creative culture has shaped specific parts of the city's economy. Small businesses, known as "distro", sell non-trademarked products made by local designers. Typical distro products are books, indie label records, magazines, fashion products, and other accessories. Distros are popular with young people and distance themselves from factory outlets in terms of philosophy. They arise from individual designers and young entrepreneurs, while factory outlet products generally come from large-scale garment factories.

The city administration has agreed to substantially develop seven industrial and trade areas for Bandung speciality products. These include Binong Jati Knitting Industrial and Trade Center, Cigondewah Textile Trade Center, Cihampelas Jeans Trade Center, Suci (T and Oblong) Shirt Industrial Center, Cibaduyut Shoes Industrial Center, Cibuntu Tofu and Tempeh Industrial Center, Sukamulya Sukajadi Doll Industrial Center.

Demographics

The May 2010 census enumerated 2.395 million people and that of May 2020 enumerated 2.444 million. Based on data from Statistics Indonesia, the population of Bandung in mid 2021 was 2.453 million, making Bandung the fourth most populous city in Indonesia.

The majority of Bandung's population is of Sundanese descent. Javanese are the most significant minority and mostly come from the central and the eastern parts of Java. Other minorities include Minang, Minahasan, Chinese, Batak, Malay, Korean, Indian, and Japanese. Bandung also possesses significant international communities compared with other Indonesian cities.

Culture
Bandung is a significant cultural hub in Indonesia. Most people in the surrounding province of West Java are ethnically Sundanese, with Sundanese often spoken as a first language, and the standard and informal language for communication in streets, school, work, and markets. As in the rest of the country, standard Indonesian serves as the lingua franca and primary language of government, business, media, and formal education.

Architecture

Bandung is home to numerous examples of Dutch colonial architecture, most notably the tropical Art Deco, dubbed New Indies Style. Henri Maclaine Pont was among the first Dutch architects to recognise the importance of combining each architectural style with local cultural traditions. He stressed that modern architecture should interact with local history and native elements. In 1920, Pont planned and designed buildings for the first technical university in the Dutch East Indies, Technische Hogeschool te Bandung (the present-day Bandung Institute of Technology). He was named a Professor of Architecture at the university. A striking local Sundanese roof style is seen adorning the top of the campus' ceremonial hall and is embedded in his artwork.

In the same year, another Dutch architect J Gerber designed Gouverments Bedrijven (Government Companies) in line with the colonial government's plan to move the capital from Batavia to Bandung. The building is known as Gedung Sate, named after the distinguished small satay-shaped structure on the roof, and is today used as the head office of the West Java provincial government and House of Representatives. The building is an example of a harmonious mixture between West and East architectural styles, particularly the Italian Renaissance style of arch structures in the wings and pendopo-like structures commonly found in Java in the middle section.

Several Dutch architects who shaped the city landmarks the architectural blending of modern and native traditions. In the 1930s, Bandung became known as an architectural laboratory due to the many Dutch architects who experimented with new architectural designs. Albert Aalbers added the streamline moderne style to the Art Deco by designing the DENIS bank (1936) and renovating the Savoy Homann Hotel (1939). Charles Prosper Wolff Schoemaker was one of the architects who enormously added native elements in his artworks, including the Villa Isola (1932), Hotel Preanger (1929), the regional military headquarters (1918), Gedung Merdeka (1921) and ITB Rectorate Building (1925).

Though Bandung is known for its many old Dutch architecture buildings, the city is recently going through a high-rise building boom. There are more than 100 high rise buildings in the city, and many more are under construction or planned. The following list includes buildings in Bandung that are completed or topped off and above .

Tourism

Bandung is a popular weekend destination for residents of Jakarta. The colder climate of the highland plantation area, variety of food, less expensive fashion shops located in factory outlets and distros, golf courses, and the zoo, are some of the attractions of the city. Bandung is also a popular shopping destination due to the cheap textile and fashion products, especially for Malaysian and Singaporean tourists.

In the 1990s, local designers opened denim clothing stores along Jalan Cihampelas, which was transformed into a "jeans street". The city attracts people from other big cities to buy local fashion wares, as they are cheaper than branded items. Beside Jalan Cihampelas, many factory outlets also opened at Jalan Riau, Jalan Setiabudi, and Jalan Djuanda (known as Dago). Textile factories on the outskirts of Bandung have opened factory outlets on site selling what is marketed as sisa export (rejected or over-produced export quality items). Trans Studio Mall, Bandung Indah Plaza, Cihampelas Walk, Paris Van Java Mall and 23 Paskal Shopping Center are among the popular shopping centres in Bandung.

To view the Bandung Basin clearly in its mountain surroundings, visitors travel to the Bongkor protected forest area, Saung Daweung and Arcamanik; to the slopes of West Manglayang Mountain in an area known as Caringin Tilu, with entry from Padasuka and Cicaheum to the north. Visitors going to the north of the city also find Taman Hutan Raya Ir. H. Djuanda. The Cicaheum area also hosts Bukit Moko, a tourist spot famous for its views and its steel statue of a giant star called Puncak Bintang. Bandung has several museums that should be visited by tourists, such as the Geological Museum of Bandung, the Indonesia Postal Museum, Sri Baduga Museum, and the Asian-African Conference Museum. The city government operates Bandros, a tourist bus, since 2014.

Sports

Bandung is the home of Persib Bandung, a professional football club currently competing in the highest tier of Indonesian football, the Liga 1. Bandung is also home of Prawira Bandung (ex Garuda Bandung), a professional basketball club currently competes in the Indonesian Basketball League, with its home games in the GOR Citra Arena. The roads leading up to Lembang and Dago are popular routes for mountain cycling on weekends, as Jalan Ir. H. Djuanda is zoned as car-free on Sunday mornings.

Other popular sports in Bandung include badminton and golf, with several golf courses surrounding the city.

Media

Bandung has several local daily newspapers, including Pikiran Rakyat, Galamedia, and Tribun Jabar. Several local television stations operate in Bandung, including TVRI Jawa Barat (a public regional station serving West Java, which headquartered in the city), Bandung TV, MQTV and PJTV. Many radio stations, such as Ardan FM, KLCBS, MQFM and OZ Radio, also broadcast from Bandung.

The city of Bandung was featured in the 9th and 10th leg of the American reality series The Amazing Race 23.

Transport

Road
 
Bandung can be accessed by highways from Jakarta. An intercity toll highway called Cipularang Toll Road, connecting Jakarta, Karawang, Purwakarta, Padalarang and Bandung, was completed in May 2005 and is the fastest way to reach Bandung from the capital by road. Driving time is about 1.5 hours on average. There are three other options: the Puncak route (Jakarta-Cianjur/Sukabumi-Bandung), Purwakarta route (Jakarta-Cikampek-Purwakarta-Cikalong Wetan-Padalarang-Cimahi-Bandung) and the Subang route (Jakarta-Cikampek-Subang-Lembang-Bandung). From cities further east (Cirebon, Tasikmalaya and Central Java province), Bandung can be accessed through the main provincial road. Indonesian National Route 3 links Bandung with the rest of Java towards Cilegon and Ketapang (Banyuwangi).

The Pasupati Bridge was built to relieve traffic congestion in the city for east–west transport. The  cable-stayed bridge lies through the Cikapundung Valley. The bridge is part of Bandung's comprehensive inner-city highways plan.

Bandung has two intercity bus terminals: Leuwipanjang, serving buses from the west, and Cicaheum, serving buses from the east. Both are at full capacity and are to be replaced by a new terminal at Gedebage on  land, after which the old terminals will function as inner-city terminals. The new terminal will be located next to the Gedebage railway station near Gedebage container dry port.

Local public and mass transportation 

Taxis and Online transport are widely available. The primary means of public transportation is by angkot minibuses (from angkutan, "transportation" and kota, "city"); angkot are privately operated and serve multiple routes throughout the city, and although cheap, they are considered basic and uncomfortable. To find exact angkot routes, passengers may look for information available through the drivers or at terminals.

Due to the current extent of railway lines in Bandung, only two named regional railway services, Lokal Bandung Raya and Lokal Garut Cibatuan, are serving the city, serving a single line. It catered for the suburban areas east and west of the city such as Cimahi, Padalarang, Rancaekek, Cicalengka, as well as some other neighbouring towns such as Garut and Purwakarta. KAI Commuter took over the operations of both services from its mother company KAI in 2022, anticipating planned electrification of the route by Ministry of Transport.

Public buses in Bandung and its surrounding urban area are operated by various operators, with a total 16 bus lines currently operating. DAMRI buses used to dominate as the main bus operator serving the city and its surrounding metropolitan area, first operating in the 1970s, with at some point operating more than 10 routes. However, it collapsed in October 2021, leaving 5 routes still operating. Following the example of TransJakarta, the city government introduced its own BRT system called Trans Metro Bandung on 24 September 2009. By 2022 it served 5 trunk corridors and 1 feeder routes. Both DAMRI and Trans Metro Bandung buses uses higher deck buses similar to TransJakarta, but could be stopped anywhere along its route and do not run separately from traffic. Provincial government of West Java also operates a bus route called as Safe and Healthy Bus Rapid Transit (shortened Buratas), serving only a single line. As part of nationwide bus services modernisation program called as Teman Bus, a more disciplined system branded as Trans Metro Pasundan was introduced by central government's Ministry of Transportation in December 2021. Two operators, Big Bird (part of Blue Bird Group) and DAMRI operated 5 routes inherited from former DAMRI routes under a contract with Ministry of Transport. Introduction of new bus routes in Bandung often faced resistance from angkots and extortion attempts by so-called local patrons due to perception that their revenues being stolen, leading to blockades and verbal threats against bus drivers. Due to fragmentation of brands and operators, passengers must pay again when transiting to other BRT lines or to other modes such as trains.

A more comprehensive plan to revitalise the bus system will be implemented in 2024, extending from the Trans Metro Pasundan project. It would integrate all operators within a single system called BRT Bandung Raya, with proper Bus Rapid Transit features such as dedicated lanes, frequent bus availability and bus stops. The planned system intended to use electric powered buses, both imported and locally produced.

Bandung city government also operated a fleet of city tour buses called as Bandung Tour on Bus (shortened Bandros).

Boseh is a dock-based bicycle-sharing system provided by the Transport Service (Dinas Perhubungan) of Bandung.

Air
Bandung Husein Sastranegara International Airport serves direct domestic flights to Batam, Pekanbaru, Medan, Bandar Lampung, Surabaya, Yogyakarta, Semarang, Banjarmasin, Makassar, and also international services to/from Kuala Lumpur and Singapore. The airport is located near the Dirgantara aerospace complex and Dirgantara Fairground. The Kertajati International Airport in Majalengka Regency is built to replace the Husein Sastranegara Airport.

Railway
Bandung has two large railway stations, Bandung and Kiaracondong Stations. Other smaller stations are Cimindi, Andir, Ciroyom, Cikudapateuh, and Gedebage Stations (only for freight service). Railway lines connect Bandung to Cianjur, Jakarta, Purwakarta, Bekasi, Karawang, and Cikampek to the west, and Surabaya, Malang, Yogyakarta, and Solo to the east.

Current and future development
Thirty-two bus shelters for Trans Metro Bandung (similar to TransJakarta) along Jalan Soekarno-Hatta were finished in August 2011 at the cost of Rp 13.1 billion ($1.54 million). Thirty additional buses joined the existing operation of ten buses after all the shelters were finished.

In 2012, phase-1 of Bandung electric commuter rail system was scheduled to be built to connect Padalarang, Cimahi, Bandung, and Cicalengka with 13 Trans Metro Bandung bus corridors to serve as feeders. Phase-2 will connect Cicalengka to Jatinangor. As of today the system is yet to build.

On 21 June 2011, Perum DAMRI launched two buses on the Cibiru-Kebon Kelapa especially for female passengers only with female drivers.

On 5 August 2011, Jusuf Kalla announced that he would like to build a monorail in Bandung with a value of Rp 4 trillion ($470 million).

, a cable car project 'Bandung Skybridge' to connect Pasteur (Cihampelas) to Sabuga (Taman Sari) was said to be 90% complete and awaiting legal authorisation to operate. However, the project has still to be realised. To ease Cihampelas traffic congestion, the city mayor, Ridwan Kamil inaugurated a skywalk for pedestrians only from Cihampelas to Tamansari on 4 February 2017. The skywalk, named Teras Cihampelas, was built with a budget of Rp 45 billion. Vehicles will be able to be parked at Tamansari. The city has also announced an intention to build LRT (Light Rail Transit).

Bandung is planned to be served by Jakarta-Bandung high-speed rail via its terminus in Tegalluar, located east of the city in Bandung Regency. Due to constraints, stations serving Bandung are neither within Bandung city centre nor the limits of Bandung city. Instead, a feeder service will ply between Padalarang HSR station and the main Bandung station, using existing tracks.

Education

Bandung has nearly 50 higher educational institutions and is among the most popular destinations for education in Indonesia. There are hundreds of public and private schools in the city and several state-funded and administered Junior High Schools (SMP Negeri), State High Schools (SMA Negeri) and State Vocational School (SMK). At least sixteen universities—three of which are state-owned—and 45 professional schools are scattered across the city. Education from social sciences and technology to tourism education can be found at one of these universities.

Among the universities located in Bandung include Bandung Institute of Technology (Institut Teknologi Bandung, ITB), Universitas Padjadjaran (Padjadjaran University), Telkom University (Universitas Telkom), National Institute of Technology (Indonesia) (Institut Teknologi Nasional), Parahyangan Catholic University, Universitas Islam Bandung (Bandung Islamic University), Universitas Kristen Maranatha (Maranatha Christian University), Universitas Islam Nusantara (Nusantara Islamic University), Universitas Pendidikan Indonesia (Indonesia University of Education), Universitas Islam Negeri Sunan Gunung Djati (Sunan Gunung Djati Islamic State University), Universitas Pasundan (Pasundan University), Politeknik Negeri Bandung (Bandung State Polytechnic), and Sekolah Tinggi Pariwisata Bandung (Bandung Institute of Tourism), all being considered among the best universities in their respective fields of speciality in Indonesia. Established in 1920, ITB is Indonesia's oldest and most prestigious technical university. Universitas Pendidikan Indonesia (formerly IKIP Bandung, established in 1954). Universitas Komputer Indonesia (UNIKOM) is one of the first institutions of higher education established after Indonesian independence and is currently a leading education university in the country. Universitas Padjadjaran (established in 1956) is considered to be one of the best universities in the country in the fields of medicine, law, communication, and economics.

International schools are also available in the city. They include the Bandung Alliance Intercultural School, Bandung Independent School, Bandung Japanese School, Bina Bangsa School Bandung, Bina Persada School, and Stamford School. In the north of Bandung, Bosscha Observatory is the only observatory in Indonesia. Construction of the observatory began in 1923 and was completed in 1928. In 1922, the first international publication from Bosscha Observatory was published, and in 1959, the observatory was absorbed as a part of the Department of Astronomy at the Bandung Institute of Technology.

Notable schools
 Trinitas Senior High School
 SMA Negeri 3 Bandung
 SMA Negeri 5 Bandung
 SMA Negeri 6 Bandung
 SMK Negeri 10 Bandung
 Bandung Alliance International School
 Bandung International School

Notable people

International relations

Several countries have set up their consulates in Bandung, including France, Netherlands, Poland, Latvia, Hungary, Austria, etc. 

Bandung has sister relationships with a number of cities worldwide:

References

External links

 
 The official website of Bandung Government

 
Populated places in West Java
Provincial capitals in Indonesia